Hybrid is the third studio album by Bermudian dancehall artist Collie Buddz. It was released on May 24, 2019 via Harper Digital Entertainment. It features guest appearances from Russ, B Young, Dizzy Wright, Johnny Cosmic, Stonebwoy and Tech N9NE. The album peaked at number 1 on the US Billboard Reggae Albums chart and number 20 on the Independent Albums chart. It spawned five singles: "Legal Now", "Love & Reggae", "Bounce It", "Bank" and "Show Love".

Track listing

Personnel
Colin "Collie Buddz" Harper – vocals, songwriter, producer, executive producer
Russell "Russ" Vitale – vocals & songwriter (tracks: 1, 10)
Bertan "B Young" Jafer – vocals & songwriter (track 1)
Livingstone Etse Satekla – vocals & songwriter (track 4)
La'Reonte Wright – vocals & songwriter (track 6)
Aaron Dontez Yates – vocals & songwriter (track 8)
Syreeta Archie – backing vocals (track 2)
Andrew Mcintyre – guitar (tracks: 2, 5, 10)
Johnny Cosmic – guitar (tracks: 5, 10), songwriter (track 7), producer (tracks: 7, 9)
Shawn Mitchell – bass (tracks: 2, 5, 10)
Raymond Stewart – keyboards (tracks: 5, 10)
Marvelon Mitchell – drums (track 2)
Niko Marzouca – mixing (tracks: 1-5, 7-10)
Robert Marks – mixing (tracks: 1-5, 7-10)
Migui Maloles – mixing (track 6)
Dave Fore – mastering
Igor Katz – executive producer

Chart history

References

External links
 Hybrid by Collie Buddz on Bandcamp
 Hybrid by Collie Buddz on ITunes

2019 albums
Collie Buddz albums